Grant Township is the name of some places in the U.S. state of Michigan:

 Grant Township, Cheboygan County, Michigan
 Grant Township, Clare County, Michigan
 Grant Township, Grand Traverse County, Michigan
 Grant Township, Huron County, Michigan
 Grant Township, Iosco County, Michigan
 Grant Township, Keweenaw County, Michigan
 Grant Township, Mason County, Michigan
 Grant Township, Mecosta County, Michigan
 Grant Township, Newaygo County, Michigan
 Grant Township, Oceana County, Michigan
 Grant Township, St. Clair County, Michigan

See also 
 Grant, Michigan, a city in Newaygo County
Grant  Township (disambiguation)

Michigan township disambiguation pages